In organic chemistry, carbon nitrides are compounds consisting only of carbon and nitrogen atoms.

Covalent network compounds 
 Beta carbon nitride - a solid with a formula β-, which is predicted to be harder than diamond.
 Graphitic carbon nitride - g-, with important catalytic and sensor properties.

Azafullerenes 

 Azafullerenes are a class of heterofullerenes in which the element substituting for carbon is nitrogen.

Cyanofullerenes 

 Cyanofullerenes are a class of modified fullerenes in which cyano- groups are attached to a fullerene skeleton. These have the formula , where n takes the values 1 to 9.

Cyanogen 
 Cyanogen -  (NCCN)
 Isocyanogen -  (CNCN)
 Diisocyanogen -  (CNNC)
 Paracyanogen - a cyanogen polymer, 
 Paraisocyanogen - a cyanogen polymer,

Percyanoalkynes, -alkenes and -alkanes 

 dicyanoacetylene - , also called carbon subnitride or but-2-ynedinitrile
 tetracyanoethylene - 
 tetracyanomethane - 
 2,2-diisocyanopropanedinitrile - 
 hexacyanoethane - 
 hexacyanocyclopropane - 
 hexacyanobutadiene - 

Dicyanopolyynes 

Dicyanopolyynes are composed of a chain of carbon atoms with alternating single and triple bonds, terminated by nitrogen atoms. Although not a polyyne dicyanoacetylene otherwise fits within this series.

 dicyanobutadiyne (dicyanodiacetylene) - 
 dicyanohexatriyne -

Perazidoalkynes, -alkenes and -alkanes 

 tetraazidomethane -

Percyanoheterocycles 

 pentacyanopyridine - 
 tetracyanopyrazine - 
 tricyanotriazine - 
 tetracyano-bitriazine - 
 dicyanotetrazine - 
 hexacyanotrisimidazole - 
 hexacyanohexaazatriphenylene -

Aromatic cyanocarbons 

 hexacyanobenzene - 
 octacyanonaphthalene - 
 decacyanoanthracene -

Other compounds 

 cyanonitrene - CN2 (NCN)
 azodicarbonitrile - C2N4 ((NCN)2)
 cyanogen azide - CN4 (NC.N3)
 1-diazidocarbamoyl-5-azidotetrazole - C2N14
 2,2′-azobis(5-azidotetrazole) - C2N16
 triazidotriazine (cyanuric triazide) - C3N12 (C3N3(N3)3)
 triazidoheptazine - C6N16 (C6N7(N3)3)
 tricyanomethanimine (Dicyanomethylene-cyanamide) - C4N4 ((CN).N.C(CN)2)
 diazidodicyanoethylene - C4N8 ((N3)2.C.C(CN)2)
 dicyanodiazomethane - C3N4 ((CN)2.C.N2)
 dicyanocarbene - C3N2 (and isomers cyanoisocyanocarbene, diisocyanocarbene, 3-cyano-2H-azirenylidene and 3-isocyano-2H-azirenylidene)
 1,3,5-triazido-2,4,6-tricyanobenzene - C9N12 (C6(CN)3(N3)3)
 nitrogen tricyanide N(CN)3 and carbon bis(cyanamide) NCN=C=NCN, two formal monomers of polymeric C3N4

Anions 

 cyanide and isocyanide -  and 
 dicyanamide - 
 tricyanomethanide - 
 pentacyanoethanide - 
 pentacyanopropenide (pentacyanoallyl anion) - 
 2-dicyanomethylene-1,1,3,3-tetracyanopropanediide 
 tricyanomelaminate anion - 
 melonate - 
 cyanoacetlyide - 
 cyanobutadiynylide - 
 cyanopolyynide anions -  (n odd)

See also 
 Oxocarbon

References 

Organic compounds
Nitrogen compounds